Lejota cyanea  (Smith 1912), the Cobalt Trunksitter, is an uncommon species of syrphid fly observed in the northeast and west coast of North America. Hoverflies can remain nearly motionless in flight. The adults are also known as flower flies for they are commonly found on flowers, from which they get both energy-giving nectar and protein-rich pollen. The larvae of this genus are found in decaying tree roots.

Distribution
Canada, United States.

References

Eristalinae
Insects described in 1912
Diptera of North America
Hoverflies of North America